The Kanjari Boriyavi–Vadtal line belongs to  division of Western Railway zone in Gujarat State.

History

Kanjari–Vadtal branch line was opened in 1929. The length of Kanjari–Vadtal branch line was 6 km.

References

5 ft 6 in gauge railways in India
Railway lines in Gujarat